

Public

Private

 or 39

See also
 Education in Azerbaijan
 Education in the Soviet Union (historical)
 List of universities in Baku

Further reading 
Azerbaijan university, college and institute directory at www.university-directory.eu

References

Azerbaijan education-related lists
Azerbaijan
Azerbaijan
Azerbaijan